Nicholas Oliver "Nik" Elsmore (born 28 June 1977) is a rally driver who made his rally debut in 1995. The son of former rally driver Graham Elsmore, Nik was born in Gloucester, England and competed in various seasons of the World Rally Championship (WRC), British Rally Championship (BRC), Association of National Championship Rally Organizers (ANCRO), British Trials and Rally Drivers Association (BTRDA), and the European Rally Championship (ERC) over his 15 year career.

Rally History 
Since his rally debut in 1995, Elsmore has won a string of accolades. Driving a Vauxhall Nova GSI, by the end of 1997, he was voted one of the finalists for the “Ford/Motoring News Rally Champion of the Future” as well as being shortlisted to drive for the SEAT UK Rally team.

Elsmore moved to the Nissan Sunny GTI in 1998 and finished his first event in 2nd place overall. In 1999 he won the prestigious BTRDA Gold Star National Championship, only dropping two points throughout the season. Winning five out of the six rounds and placed second in the other. It was the most convincing Championship win in years. Also during 1999 he won his class in the British Rally Championship and was the leading independent driver, until engine failure on the last round.

For 2000, Elsmore transitioned from a Formula 2 (front wheel drive) to a Mitsubishi Evo 4x4. The season started with Elsmore coming in 7th overall in the Rally of Wales (British Championship) and receiving an additional award for “The Most Promising Young Driver”. The season ended at the Manx International Rally with a 5th O/A.

Using an Evo 5, Elsmore’s first overall win was achieved against much tougher world-class opposition on the Wyedean at the start to the 2001 season. Also it saw the start of an opportunity to compete in various European and World Championship events at the wheel of a Guy Colsoul Rallysport car. The season saw Elsmore competing first in Sweden then Belgium, Germany, Finland, Corsica and finally the Network Q Rally of Great Britain.

With a 7th Overall on the Wyedean starting off the 2002 season, the team continued with UK rallies only. Another 7th was achieved on the Pirelli Rally and 14th on the Rally of Wales. With sponsorship being found with Hydrex Equipment UK, Elsmore notched up another 3rd overall on the Woodpecker Stages, plus a 10th on the Bulldog Stages. Finally, at the end of the year, 31st overall was achieved on the Network Q Rally of Great Britain, the final round of the World Rally Championship.

The 2003 season highlighted Elsmore’s ability to mix it with the leading British drivers, competing in various British rally events and setting many fastest stage times throughout the year. Elsmore was labelled as one of the fastest Group N drivers in the country, proving his status by finishing in the Top 20 of the Wales Rally GB, the final round of the World Rally Championship.

In 2004, Elsmore entered the Mitsubishi Championship, one of the most competitive one make championships to date. Breaking his arm in the first event of the season slowed progress for the first few rounds, but he finished the Championship in 3rd position.

Elsmore was the leading driver throughout the first half of the 2005 season. However, a rare engine/electrical fault hampered the championship position, finishing the season in 4th position.

2006 was a big learning curve for the newly formed Elsmore Rally Team. Gaining publicity for the sponsors, competing on several selected events throughout the year. The team worked well and Elsmore achieved solid performances during the season.

With the Elsmore Rally Team going into their second year, it was decided to once again fight for the Mitsubishi Evo Challenge title in a new Mitsubishi Evo IX rally car. 2007 would see the best entry yet, with many high profile drivers fighting for the prize of a works drive with Mitsubishi. The season started with a brake failure, with Elsmore still pushing hard, a huge crash on round three would see his title hopes dashed. Relying more on other driver's misfortune, Elsmore put in a string of consistent results and finished 3rd overall in the championship.

The fight continued in 2008 with the ever competitive ANCRO & Evo Challenge Championships. Introducing a new co-driver Craig Drew to the Elsmore Rally Team proved to be the turning point this season. The battle continued to the very last event and a joint 1st overall in the Mitsubishi Challenge was the reward at the close of season. This was the best result to date for the team, and as an added bonus Elsmore achieved 4th overall in the National ANCRO Championship. As the highest placed Group N driver, the team proved competitive against the World Rally Championship machinery.

Elsmore continued to use his full International Spec Group N Mitsubishi Lancer Evo IX for the 2009 season. Prepared by chief engineer, Rex Paddock, based in the Forest of Dean, Elsmore won the Wyedean Rally for the second time, and the pace continued throughout the season with some of the best driving to date. Mid-season, chief engineer & Elsmore’s mentor, Rex Paddock was killed in an aeroplane accident. His untimely death was a huge loss to the team, through they still finished 2nd overall in the Mitsubishi Challenge and 4th in the ANCRO Championship.

Elsmore retired from the sport in 2010.

With the Wyedean Rally having its 40th anniversary in February 2015, as a former winner, Elsmore was invited to take part in the event as a one-off guest appearance. A win of over two minutes and 5th overall in an Evo IX, gave Elsmore the Star of the Rally award, voted for by the national motoring press.

External links
 http://www.ewrc-results.com/profile.php?p=1328
 eWRC results

1977 births
Living people
British rally drivers